The arrondissement of Limoges is an arrondissement of France in the Haute-Vienne department in the Nouvelle-Aquitaine region. It has 108 communes.

Composition

The communes of the arrondissement of Limoges, and their INSEE codes, are:
 
 Aixe-sur-Vienne (87001)
 Ambazac (87002)
 Augne (87004)
 Aureil (87005)
 Beaumont-du-Lac (87009)
 Bersac-sur-Rivalier (87013)
 Beynac (87015)
 Les Billanges (87016)
 Boisseuil (87019)
 Bonnac-la-Côte (87020)
 Bosmie-l'Aiguille (87021)
 Bujaleuf (87024)
 Burgnac (87025)
 Bussière-Galant (87027)
 Les Cars (87029)
 Le Chalard (87031)
 Châlus (87032)
 Champnétery (87035)
 Chaptelat (87038)
 Château-Chervix (87039)
 Châteauneuf-la-Forêt (87040)
 Le Châtenet-en-Dognon (87042)
 Cheissoux (87043)
 Condat-sur-Vienne (87048)
 Coussac-Bonneval (87049)
 Couzeix (87050)
 La Croisille-sur-Briance (87051)
 Domps (87058)
 Eybouleuf (87062)
 Eyjeaux (87063)
 Eymoutiers (87064)
 Feytiat (87065)
 Flavignac (87066)
 La Geneytouse (87070)
 Glandon (87071)
 Glanges (87072)
 Isle (87075)
 Jabreilles-les-Bordes (87076)
 Janailhac (87077)
 La Jonchère-Saint-Maurice (87079)
 Jourgnac (87081)
 Ladignac-le-Long (87082)
 Laurière (87083)
 Lavignac (87084)
 Limoges (87085)
 Linards (87086)
 Magnac-Bourg (87088)
 Masléon (87093)
 Meilhac (87094)
 Meuzac (87095)
 La Meyze (87096)
 Moissannes (87099)
 Nedde (87104)
 Neuvic-Entier (87105)
 Nexon (87106)
 Nieul (87107)
 Pageas (87112)
 Le Palais-sur-Vienne (87113)
 Panazol (87114)
 Peyrat-le-Château (87117)
 Peyrilhac (87118)
 Pierre-Buffière (87119)
 La Porcherie (87120)
 Rempnat (87123)
 Rilhac-Lastours (87124)
 Rilhac-Rancon (87125)
 La Roche-l'Abeille (87127)
 Royères (87129)
 Roziers-Saint-Georges (87130)
 Saint-Amand-le-Petit (87132)
 Saint-Bonnet-Briance (87138)
 Saint-Denis-des-Murs (87142)
 Sainte-Anne-Saint-Priest (87134)
 Saint-Gence (87143)
 Saint-Genest-sur-Roselle (87144)
 Saint-Germain-les-Belles (87146)
 Saint-Gilles-les-Forêts (87147)
 Saint-Hilaire-Bonneval (87148)
 Saint-Hilaire-les-Places (87150)
 Saint-Jean-Ligoure (87151)
 Saint-Jouvent (87152)
 Saint-Julien-le-Petit (87153)
 Saint-Just-le-Martel (87156)
 Saint-Laurent-les-Églises (87157)
 Saint-Léger-la-Montagne (87159)
 Saint-Léonard-de-Noblat (87161)
 Saint-Martin-le-Vieux (87166)
 Saint-Martin-Terressus (87167)
 Saint-Maurice-les-Brousses (87169)
 Saint-Méard (87170)
 Saint-Paul (87174)
 Saint-Priest-Ligoure (87176)
 Saint-Priest-sous-Aixe (87177)
 Saint-Priest-Taurion (87178)
 Saint-Sulpice-Laurière (87181)
 Saint-Sylvestre (87183)
 Saint-Vitte-sur-Briance (87186)
 Saint-Yrieix-la-Perche (87187)
 Saint-Yrieix-sous-Aixe (87188)
 Sauviat-sur-Vige (87190)
 Séreilhac (87191)
 Solignac (87192)
 Surdoux (87193)
 Sussac (87194)
 Verneuil-sur-Vienne (87201)
 Veyrac (87202)
 Vicq-sur-Breuilh (87203)
 Le Vigen (87205)

History

The arrondissement of Limoges was created in 1800.

As a result of the reorganisation of the cantons of France which came into effect in 2015, the borders of the cantons are no longer related to the borders of the arrondissements. The cantons of the arrondissement of Limoges were, as of January 2015:

 Aixe-sur-Vienne
 Ambazac
 Châlus
 Châteauneuf-la-Forêt
 Eymoutiers
 Laurière
 Limoges-Beaupuy
 Limoges-Carnot
 Limoges-Centre
 Limoges-Cité
 Limoges-Condat
 Limoges-Corgnac
 Limoges-Couzeix
 Limoges-Émailleurs
 Limoges-Grand-Treuil
 Limoges-Isle
 Limoges-La Bastide
 Limoges-Landouge
 Limoges-Le Palais
 Limoges-Panazol
 Limoges-Puy-las-Rodas
 Limoges-Vigenal
 Nexon
 Nieul
 Pierre-Buffière
 Saint-Germain-les-Belles
 Saint-Léonard-de-Noblat
 Saint-Yrieix-la-Perche

References

Limoges